The St. Paul Saints, also known as the Apostles or the White Caps, were a replacement Major League Baseball team that represented St. Paul, Minnesota in the short-lived Union Association, which existed for the  season only. The team began the 1884 season in the Northwestern League as the Apostles. In September of that year, after compiling a 24-48 record, the team jumped to the Union Association along with the Milwaukee Brewers. The club finished its short stint in the Association with a 2-6-1 record in nine road games, earning the distinction of being the only major league team not to play a single home game.  The team was managed by Andrew Thompson. Their normal home field was the Fort Road or Fort Street Grounds, also known as West Seventh Street Park (two names for the same street).

Their top-hitting regular was pitcher/outfielder Jim Brown, who had five hits in 16 at bats, for a batting average of .313, hit four doubles, and a slugging percentage of .563.  The team also included Charlie Ganzel, their catcher, who went on to play in 786 games in a 14-season career, most notably with the Detroit Wolverines and the Boston Beaneaters.

1884 season
The 1884 St. Paul Saints (variously known also as the "White Caps" or "Apostles") joined the Union Association on September 27, 1884, partway through its season after starting the season in the Northwestern League.<ref>Thornley, Stew: Baseball in Minnesota, page 22. Minnesota Historical Society, 2006</ref> They finished with a 2–6–1 record. After the season the UA folded, as did the Saints.

 Season standings 

 Record vs. opponents 

 Roster 

 Player stats 

 Batting 

 Starters by position Note: Pos = Position; G = Games played; AB = At bats; H = Hits; Avg. = Batting average; HR = Home runs Other batters Note: G = Games played; AB = At bats; H = Hits; Avg. = Batting average; HR = Home runs Pitching 

 Starting pitchers Note: G = Games pitched; IP = Innings pitched; W = Wins; L = Losses; ERA = Earned run average; SO = Strikeouts Relief pitchers Note: G = Games pitched; W = Wins; L = Losses; SV = Saves; ERA = Earned run average; SO = Strikeouts''

References

External links
1884 Saint Paul Saints at Baseball Reference

Union Association baseball teams
Sports in Saint Paul, Minnesota
1884 establishments in Minnesota
1884 disestablishments in Minnesota
Baseball teams established in 1884
Baseball teams disestablished in 1884
Defunct baseball teams in Minnesota